Jingili was an electoral division of the Legislative Assembly in Australia's Northern Territory. One of the Legislative Assembly's original electorates, it was first contested at the 1974 election. It was abolished in 2001 and replaced by the new seat of Johnston.

Members for Jingili

Election results

References

External links

Former electoral divisions of the Northern Territory